System is a peer-reviewed academic journal covering the applications of educational technology and applied linguistics to problems of foreign language teaching and learning. It was established in 1973 and is published by Elsevier. As of 2022, the editors-in-chief, in alphabetical order, are Idoia Elola (Texas Tech University), Mairin Hennebry (The University of Tasmania), Jim McKinley (UCL Institute of Education, University of London), Lawrence Jun Zhang (University of Auckland), and Yongyan Zheng (Fudan University). The associate editor is Vincent Greenier (University of Aberdeen), the book reviews editor is Pascal Matzler (Pontificia Universidad Católica de Valparaíso), and the student editor is Nathan Thomas (UCL Institute of Education). Until 2013, System published four issues per year. In 2014, it published six issues, and since 2015 it has published eight issues per year.

Impact
According to the Journal Citation Reports, in 2021 the journal had an impact factor of 4.518 (up from 3.167 in 2020), ranking it 12th out of 194 (previously 15th out of 193) journals in the category "Linguistics" and 35th out of 267 (previously 68th out of 264) journals in the category "Education & Educational Research". Given the popularity of System as an academic research journal among second/foreign language researchers, the number of papers accepted and finally published is around 140 per year. Nonetheless, the citations to these published papers remain high. This is something the readers are really very proud of.

Former editors
Lluïsa Astruc
James A. Coleman
Norman Davies (founding editor 1973-2010)
Xuesong (Andy) Gao
Marta González-Lloret
Regine Hampel
Sarah Mercer
Ursula Stickler
Robert Vanderplank
Liang Wang

See also
List of linguistics journals

References

External links 
 

Elsevier academic journals
Education journals
Linguistics journals
Language education journals
8 times per year journals
English-language journals